MAPIC (Le marché international professionnel de l’implantation commerciale et de la distribution) is an international retail real estate show held in Cannes, France, each November. Organised by Reed MIDEM, and lasting for 3 days, the event consists of conference sessions, an exhibition area and networking events to help facilitate retail real estate development.

Although held in France, participants come from several countries. MAPIC 2021 will take place from 30 Nov-2 Dec.

Conferences 
The event offers conferences and keynote addresses aimed at retail professionals. The programme typically includes topics such as new retail concepts, multichannel strategies, integrating leisure and culture into the shopping experience, investment and expansion in mature and growing markets.

Networking at MAPIC 

Participants have the option to take part in networking sessions, designed to facilitate new business partnerships.

One of the formats offered, Speed Matching, is based on the concept of speed dating. During a 45-minute session, participants meet with 10 potential partners for 3 minutes each, giving them the time for an introduction and exchange of business cards.

Other networking opportunities include the Opening Cocktail and MAPIC Awards ceremony.

The MAPIC Awards 
Each year, developers submit their retail real estate projects for a chance to win a MAPIC Award in one of several categories. Three nominees are chosen in each category by a jury of industry professionals. During MAPIC, the jury, as well as MAPIC delegates vote to determine the winners. The awards are then presented during an awards ceremony. MAPIC Award was created in 1996 and initially was focused to target best in class retail concept. Since 1996 till 2007 there were nominations for retailers divided into six categories: Clothing & Fashion Accessories, Household & Electrical Goods, Leisure, Catering Outlet, Services and Health & Beauty and the first award's nomination related to commercial real estate developers were launched in 2007.

2002 MAPIC Awards winners 

 Best Clothing & Fashion Accessories: Foot Locker
 Best Household & Electrical Goods: Media Markt
 Best Leisure: Village Cinemas, Anděl City, Praha
 Best Catering Outlet: Starbucks 
 Best Services: Jean Louis David by Regis Corporation
 Best Health & Beauty: L’Occitane

2003 MAPIC Awards winners 

 Best Clothing & Fashion Accessories: Reserved
 Best Household & Electrical Goods: Bo Concept
 Best Leisure Retailing: Fnac
 Best Catering Outlet: Australian Homemade
 Best Services: Bel & Blanc (laundries)
 Best Health & Beauty: Lush

2004 MAPIC Awards winners 

 Best Clothing & Fashion Accessories: Massimo Dutti
 Best Household & Electrical Goods: Media Saturn
 Best Leisure Retailing: Lego
 Best Catering Outlet: Paul
 Best Services: The Phone House
 Best Health & Beauty: Yves Roches

2005 MAPIC Awards winners 

 Best Clothing & Fashion Accessories: New Yorker
 Best Household & Electrical Goods: Bose
 Best Leisure Retailing: EB Games
 Best Catering Outlet: Tchibo
 Best Services: Franck Provost 
 Best Health & Beauty: Douglas

2006 MAPIC Awards winners 

 Best Clothing & Fashion Accessories: Jack & Jones
 Best Household & Electrical Goods: The White Company
 Best Leisure Retailing: Smyk
 Best Catering Outlet: Burger King 
 Best Services: Fortis-Credit4me
 Best Health & Beauty: The Body Shop

2007 MAPIC Awards winners 

 Best Clothing & Fashion Accessories: GEOX
 Best Household & Electrical Goods: Media Saturn
 Best Leisure Retailing: Build-a-Bear workshop 
 Best Catering Outlet: Illy
 Best Services: The Phone House
 Best Health & Beauty: Yves Roches 
New categories launched in 2007:

 Best Shopping center: Fórum Coimbra, Coimbra, Portugal 
 Developer of the year: Multi Development Portugal

2008 MAPIC Awards winners 
This year the composition and names of nominations were changed and the official name of the 2008 Mapic Award was MAPIC EG Retail Awards.  The Award was organized for the first time between Mapic and Estates Gazette (UK).
 Retail success story: Koton, Turkey 
 Developer of the year: ORTA Gayrimenkul Yatirim Hizmetleri ve Turizm A.S, Turkey (Developer of Istinye Park)
 Shopping Center of the year: Cabot Circus, Bristol, UK submitted by Hammerson and Land Securities
 Consultant of the year: Cushman & Wakefield, UK 
 Best Eco-initiative: Grand Arcade shopping centre, Wigan, UK, submitted by Modus Properties 
 Urban Regeneration Initiative: Department for Social Development, Belfast City Centre Regeneration Directorate, UK
 Outstanding Achievement of the year: Bob Bringer, Vice president for Retail, Apple Inc., USA
 Retail Personality of the year: David Leino, Senior Vice President, Abercrombie & Fitch, US

2009 MAPIC Awards winners 
 Retail Success Story: Primark, UK 
 Best Concept: Kidzania, Mexico 
 Developer of the year: Multi Corporation bv, Netherlands 
 Consultant of the year: CB Richard Ellis, UK
 Best Sustainable Retail Development of the year: Ernst-August-Galerie, Hannover, Germany, submitted by ECE Projektmanagement G.m.b.H. & Co. KG
 Urban Regeneration Initiative: Liverpool One, Liverpool, UK submitted by Grosvenor

2010 MAPIC Awards winners 
 Best International Retailer: Jack Wolfskin, Germany 
 Best New Retail Concept: Lego, Denmark  
 Best Shopping Centre: Odysseum, Montpellier, France  
 Best Improved City Attractiveness: Brussels, Capital Region, Belgium 
As France was 2010 year's MAPIC Country of Honour, Jean-Paul Freret, Director of Expansion and Real Estate, Vivarte Group has been chosen as the 2010 'Personality of the Year'.

2011 MAPIC Awards winners 
Best New Retail Concept: Asics Amsterdam Flagship, The Netherlands, submitted by Wests Design Consultants
Best Retail Expansion: Desigual, Spain
Best Retailer in City Centre: Abercrombie & Fitch, USA
Best Retail Development: Eurovea, Bratislava, Slovakia, submitted by Ballymore Eurovea, a.s.
Best Refurbished Retail Development: Galeria Echo, Kielce, Poland, submitted by Echo Investment SA

2012 MAPIC Awards winners 

 Best Fashion and Footwear Retail Concept: Adidas Neo, Germany
 Best Food and Beverage Retail Concept: EXKI, Belgium 
 Best High Street Retail real estate development: Santa Monica Place, Santa Monica, USA submitted by The Jerde Partnership 
 Best Multichannel Strategy: McDonald's, France
 Best Retail and Leisure Development: Morocco Mall, Casablanca, Morocco, submitted by Design International
 Best Retail Global Expansion: Debenhams, UK
 Most Innovative Shopping Center: The Star Vista, Singapore, submitted by CapitaMalls Asia

As Russia was 2012 year's MAPIC Country of Honour, Samvel Sarkisovitch Karapetyan, chairman and founder of the Russian Tashir Group of companies, has been chosen as the 2012 'Personality of the Year'.

2013 MAPIC Awards winners 

 Best Fashion and Footwear Retail Concept: JD Sports Fashion Plc, UK
 Best Food and Beverage Retail Concept: La Place, The Netherlands 
 Best Outlet Center: Roppenheim The Style Outlets, Roppenheim, France, submitted by NEINVER France and MAB Development
 Best Retail Real Estate Development in a city center: Trinity Leeds, Leeds, United Kingdom, submitted by Land Securities
 Best omnichannel strategy: The Body Shop, UK
 Best retail and leisure development: Puerto Venezia, Zaragoza, Spain
 Best Retail Global Expansion: Primark, UK
 Most Innovative Shopping Center: Emporia, Malmö, Sweden, submitted by Steen & Ström Sverige AB
 Special Jury Award: St. Lazare Paris, France, submitted by Klépierre

In honour of project ‘Retail Rising Stars’ of 2013 – China, Brazil, India and Russia – the jury awarded four developers: Wanda (China), Sonae Sierra (Brazil), DLF Mall of India (India) and Crocus Group (Russia)

2014 MAPIC Awards winners 

 Best Fashion and Footwear Retail Concept: Uniqlo, Japan
 Best Food and Beverage Retail Concept: Vapiano, Germany 
 Best New Retail Concept: Causses, France 
 Best Retail Global Expansion: Kiko Milano, Italy 
 Best Outlet Center: Fashion Outlets of Chicago, Rosemont, IL, USA, submitted by RTKL Associates Inc.
 Best Refurbished Center: Armada development project, Ankara, Turkey, submitted by A Tasarim Mimarlik – Ali Osman Ozturk
 Best Urban Center: Les Terrasses du Port, Marseille, France, submitted by Hammerson
 Special Jury Award Retailer: New Look, UK
 Special Jury Award Project: Beaugrenelle, Paris, France, submitted by Apsys
 MAPIC 20th Anniversary Special Tribute to China: Wanda Group 
 MAPIC 20th Anniversary Special Tribute: Frédéric Laloum, General Manager, Leasing, Altarea-Cogedim, France

2015 MAPIC Awards winners  
Best Fashion and Footwear Retail Concept: Primark, Ireland
Best Food and Beverage Retail Concept: Five Guys, United States
Best New Retail Design Concept: Tanya Heath Paris, France
Best Retail Global Expansion: Vapiano, Germany
Best Retail Digital Strategy: ECE Future Labs, Germany
Best Pop-up Shop: Magnum Pleasure Store – Covent Garden, London, UK
Best New Shopping Center: Milaneo, Stuttgart, Germany
Best Redeveloped Shopping Center: Alegro Setúbal, Lisbon, Portugal
Best Outlet Center: McArthurGlen Designer Outlets Vancouver Airport, Vancouver, Canada

2017 MAPIC Awards winners 
 RETAILER OF THE YEAR Nike USA
 BEST RETAIL GLOBAL EXPANSION Flying Tiger Copenhagen Denmark
 BEST NEW RETAIL CONCEPT Rapha Racing Ltd UK
 BEST RETAIL STORE DESIGN Adidas New York, USA
 BEST LEISURE CONCEPT IN A RETAIL SPACE iFLY WORLD France
 BEST O2O STRATEGY Digital Mall Germany
 BEST POP UP SHOP Imad's Syrian Kitchen London, UK
 BEST F&B CONCEPT Nespresso Switzerland
 BEST NEW SHOPPING CENTRE Victoria Gate Leeds, UK Architect: ACME Developer: Hammerson Other: Sir Robert MacAlpine
 BEST REDEVELOPED SHOPPING CENTRE Chadstone Shopping Centre Melbourne, Australia
 BEST OUTLET CENTRE Tsawwassen Mills Tsawwassen First Nation, Canada
 BEST RETAIL URBAN PROJECT Hoog Catharijne Utrecht, The Netherlands
 BEST FUTURA SHOPPING CENTRE Prado Marseille, France
 CUSTOMER SERVICE EXCELLENCE AWARD Rosario Lozano Bretone Position: Sales Employee Company: MediaMarkt Saturn Retail Group Spain
 INDUSTRY ACHIEVEMENT Klaus Striebich Managing Director Leasing, ECE Projektmanagement Germany
 COMPANY EXCELLENCE PARTNER WANDA GROUP China

2018 MAPIC Awards winners 
 Best Retail Global Expansion: Uniqlo, Japan 
 Best New Retail Concept: Marc O’Polo Strandcasino, Germany 
 Best Retail Store Design: Franprix Darwin, Paris, France 
 Best Leisure Concept in a Retail Space: Open House, Central Embassy, Bangkok, Thailand 
 Best Pop-up Shop: Samsung Galaxy Studio, USA, submitted by: PMK*BNC  
 Best Outlet Center: The Village,  Villefontaine, France, architect: Gianni Ranaulo / GR Design, developer: Compagnie de Phalsbourg
 Best Retail Urban Project: Grand Hôtel Dieu, Lyon, France, architect: RL&A Didier Repellin / AIA Architectes Albert Constantin, developer: Crédit Agricole Assurances, Caisse Régionale Crédit Agricole Mutuel Centre-Est, Effiage
 Best Futura Shopping Center: American Dream, East Rutherford, USA, architect: Gensler, developer: Triple Five WorldWide Group
 Best New Shopping Center: Suzhou Center Mall, Suzhou, China, architect: Benoy, developer: CapitaLand and Suzhou Hengtai Holding
 Best Redeveloped Shopping Center: Westfield Century City, Los Angeles, USA, architect: URW Design, Gensler, developer: Unibail-Rodamco-Westfield
 Best Shopping Center Innovation: Transaction Connect, France 
 Best Retailer of the Year: Groupe Galeries Lafayette, France
 Best Industry Partner: AEON Mall, Japan 
 Personality of the Year: Christophe Cuvillier, Group Chief Executive Officer Unibail-Rodamco-Westfield

2019 MAPIC Awards winners 

 Best Retail Global Expansion: Niu Flagship Italia, Italy
 Retailer of the Year: Tommy Hilfiger, Netherlands 
 Best Food & Beverages Retail Concept: Boxpark Wembley, UK
 Best Retail Concept: Nous épiceries anti-gaspi, France
 Best Store Design:  Microsoft, London, UK, submitted by Gensler
 Best Leisure Concept: Arkose, France
 Best Retail Innovation: Wishibam For Business, France
 Best Shopping Center: ICONSIAM, Bangkok, Thailand, architect: Benoy and Urban Architect, developer: Siam Piwa
 Best Outlet Center: Torino Outlet Village, Turin, Italy, architect: Claudio Silvestrin, developer: Arcus Real Estate
 Best Retail City Center Regeneration:  City Plaza, Wuppertal, Germany, architect: Chapman Taylor, developer: Signature Capital
 Best Futura Shopping Center: Val Saint Lambert Free Time Park, Seraing, Belgium, architect: Christian Sauvage (retail), Minale Design Strategy (Design), Chapman Taylor (leisure), Altiplan (offices), developer: Immobilière du Val Saint Lambert
 Special Jury Award: Jewel Changi Airport, architect: Safdie Architects, developer: Jewel Changi Airport Trustee Pte Ltd, a joint venture by Changi Airport Group & CapitaLand
 Achievement of the Year:  Chantal Zimmer, Déléguée Générale, Fédération Française de la Franchise, France

Country of Honour 
Every year, MAPIC names one country as the "Country of Honour", about which there is a series of conference sessions and events. In 2013, the format was slightly changed, and four countries were recognised as "Retail Rising Stars": Brazil, China, India and Russia.

References

International conferences
Business conferences
Economy of Cannes